Pe Aye (born 10 October 1936) is a Burmese weightlifter. He competed in the men's middleweight event at the 1964 Summer Olympics.

References

External links
 

1936 births
Living people
Burmese male weightlifters
Olympic weightlifters of Myanmar
Weightlifters at the 1964 Summer Olympics
Place of birth missing (living people)